Hates may be:
 the plural of “hate” (as a noun) or a conjugated verb form of “hate”
 a surname:
 Adrian Hates, German musician

See also 
 Hate (disambiguation)
 Hades (disambiguation)